Leonidas Hubbard (born 1822) was a Michigan politician.

Early life
Hubbard was born in Portage County, Ohio in 1822. Hubbard was mostly self-educated. Hubbard taught in school for several years. In 1852, Hubbard moved to the southern part of Wright Township, Hillsdale County, Michigan.

Political career
From 1853 to 1855, Hubbard served as a school inspector for Wright Township. In 1856, Wright moved to California, where he mined and hunted. In 1859, he returned to Wright Township, where he would continue to hold a number of local offices. In 1860, he served as a school inspector again. From 1862 to 1863, Hubbard served as supervisor. From 1864 to 1865, Hubbard served as the treasurer. From 1867 to 1868, Hubbard again served as supervisor. In 1870, Hubbard would serve his final term as supervisor. In 1875, Hubbard again served as treasurer. On November 3, 1874, Hubbard was elected to the Michigan House of Representatives where he represented the Hillsdale County 3rd district from January 6, 1875 to December 31, 1876. In 1876, Hubbard served as superintendent of schools in Wright Township.

Church involvement
In June 1860, reverends William Jewell and Zephaniah Shepherd organized a church from a schoolhouse in Wright of the Disciples of Christ denomination. There were about fifteen members initially. Hubbard was elected as an elder of church. In 1874, Hubbard was elected as a trustee of the church. Around 1875, Hubbard succeeded Samuel Vandervort, who had been in charge of the church for about a year. Hubbard took charge of the church for around two years, until he relieved himself.

References

1822 births
Year of death unknown
American Disciples of Christ
City and town treasurers in the United States
People from Hillsdale County, Michigan
People from Portage County, Ohio
Republican Party members of the Michigan House of Representatives
19th-century Disciples of Christ
19th-century American politicians